Aubreville's model is a tree architectural model named after André Aubréville, as he identified this pattern as common in Sapotaceae. It is a monopodial model, and characterized by single axis with rhythmic growth. In this model, each cycle of growth will produce a new group of horizontally arranged branches which themselves develop as sympodial complex axis which support leafy rosettes and flowers. Linnaeus used this feature as a distinctive character while naming the genus Terminalia.

References

Plant morphology
Plant taxonomy